CAT II may refer to:
 Instrument landing system#ILS categories
 Chloramphenicol O-acetyltransferase II, an enzyme
 Carnitine O-palmitoyltransferase II, another enzyme
 Measurement category CAT II, a class of live electrical circuits used in measurement and testing